Nicola Pavan (born 15 June 1993) is an Italian football player. He plays for Cittadella.

Club career
He made his Serie C debut for Real Vicenza on 15 September 2014 in a game against Pro Patria.

On 8 August 2019, he signed with Cittadella.

References

External links
 

1993 births
People from Thiene
Living people
Italian footballers
Serie D players
Serie C players
Serie B players
F.C. Pavia players
A.C. Renate players
A.S. Cittadella players
Association football midfielders
Sportspeople from the Province of Vicenza
Footballers from Veneto